In 1956, brothers José and Andrés, Zaragoza founded the Zaragoza Arms Factory in Mexico City, near Mexico City International Airport. The first weapon made by this outfit was a single-shot rifle .22 caliber.

Later, they started manufacturing the .22 caliber semiautomatic pistol Corla model, which was named in honor of two dealers who had the surnames Larios and Cordova. As for the brand logo, the letters H and Z correspond to "Hermanos Zaragoza".

Variants

Short model 
The total length of this was four inches and featured engraving representing The Temple of the Sun at Teotihuacan and the volcanoes Popocatepetl and  Iztaccihuatl. At the beginning of its production its planned name was "Azteca" in honor of the Aztecs, but the name was changed to "Corla" for the reasons explained above.

Long model 
The Long Model was designed due to recoil in the short model. It was decided to remove the engraving of the volcanoes and the pyramid. Total numbers manufactured were approximately 1150 units.

End of production 
Like most weapons factories in Mexico, this also disappeared after the student strike in 1968, as then-President Gustavo Díaz Ordaz made a decree to regulate firearms.

References 

Firearms of Mexico
.22 LR pistols